Simele or Semel (Syriac: ܣܡܠܐ) is a town located in the Dohuk province of Kurdistan Region in Iraq. The town is on the main road that connects Kurdistan Region to its neighbor Turkey. The town had a population of 71,557 in July 2018.

Etymology 
The word "Sêmêl" may originate from the Kurdish words  "sê" and "mil" meaning "three hills", or "sê mal" meaning "three homes".

Information 
Simele was a small Kurdish village until the mid-1910s as the village was populated by Armenian and Assyrian refugees fleeing massacres during Sayfo and the Armenian genocide. During the Simele massacre in 1933, around three thousand Assyrians were massacred prompting many to flee the country as a consequence. The main Assyrian tribe in Simele at the time was Baz.

In 2011, the population was mostly Kurdish with a small Assyrian minority of 635 people. Around half of the Assyrian minority adhere to the Assyrian Church of the East. A small Armenian minority is still present in the town.

Footnotes

Cities in Iraqi Kurdistan
Populated places in Dohuk Province
Assyrian communities in Iraq
Kurdish settlements in Iraq
Simele